James Simpson  (1799–1869) was a British civil engineer. He was president of the Institution of Civil Engineers from January 1853 to January 1855.

James Simpson was the fourth son of Thomas Simpson, engineer of the Chelsea Waterworks. James succeeded his father in both this post and that of engineer of the Lambeth Waterworks Company. It was under Simpson's instruction that the Chelsea Waterworks became the first in the country to install a slow sand filtration system to purify the water they were drawing from the River Thames. This filter consisted of successive beds of loose brick, gravel and sand to remove solids from the water.

He also designed waterworks at Windsor Castle and Bristol as well as The Wooden Pier at Southend on Sea.

Simpson established J. Simpson & Co., a manufacturer of steam engines and pumps, making several improvements to their design.

References 

        
        
        
        
        
        

English civil engineers
Presidents of the Institution of Civil Engineers
Presidents of the Smeatonian Society of Civil Engineers
1799 births
1869 deaths
19th-century British engineers
Fellows of the Royal Society